Lawrence of St Martin (or Laurence de Sancto Martino) was a medieval Bishop of Rochester.

Lawrence was a royal clerk and held prebends in the dioceses of Chichester and Salisbury. He was also archdeacon of the diocese of Coventry.

Lawrence was elected on 19 October 1250 and consecrated on 9 April 1251. He was enthroned at Rochester Cathedral after 24 October 1251.

Lawrence died on 3 June 1274.

Citations

References
 British History Online Bishops of Rochester accessed on 30 October 2007
 

Bishops of Rochester
Archdeacons of Coventry
13th-century English Roman Catholic bishops
1274 deaths
Year of birth unknown